Mohamad Wael Al Rifai (born 25 November 1990 in Homs, Syria) is a Syrian footballer. He currently plays for Al-Jazeera, which competes in the Jordan Premier League the top division in Jordan.

References

External links
 Career stats at goalzz.com

1990 births
Living people
Syrian footballers
Syrian expatriate footballers
Expatriate footballers in Jordan
Syrian expatriate sportspeople in Jordan
Association football midfielders
Syria international footballers
Al-Ahli SC (Amman) players
Al-Baqa'a Club players
Al-Jazeera (Jordan) players
Sportspeople from Homs
Syrian Premier League players